The Palio di Siena (known locally simply as Il Palio), from Latin pallium, 
plural form: Palii, is a horse race that is held twice each year, on 2 July and 16 August, in Siena, Italy.  Ten horses and riders, bareback and dressed in the appropriate colours, represent ten of the seventeen contrade, or city wards.  The Palio held on 2 July is named Palio di Provenzano, in honour of the Madonna of Provenzano, a Marian devotion particular to Siena which developed around an icon from the  area of the city. The Palio held on 16 August is named Palio dell'Assunta, in honour of the Assumption of Mary.

Sometimes, in case of exceptional events or local or national anniversaries deemed relevant and pertinent ones, the city community may decide for an extraordinary Palio, run between May and September. The last two were on 9 September 2000, to celebrate the city entering the new millennium and on 20 October 1918, in commemoration of the end of the Great War.

The Corteo Storico, a pageant to the sound of the March of the Palio, precedes the race, which attracts visitors and spectators from around the world.

The race itself, in which the jockeys ride bareback, circles the Piazza del Campo, on which a thick layer of earth has been laid.  The race is run for three laps of the piazza and usually lasts no more than 90 seconds.  It is common for a few of the jockeys to be thrown off their horses while making the treacherous turns in the piazza, and indeed, it is not unusual to see riderless horses finishing the race.

History

Origins
The earliest known antecedents of the race are medieval. The town's central piazza was the site of public games, largely combative: pugna, a sort of many-sided boxing match or brawl; jousting; and in the 16th century, bullfights. Public races organized by the contrade were popular from the 14th century onwards; called , they were run across the whole city.

When the Grand Duke of Tuscany outlawed bullfighting in 1590, the contrade took to organizing races in the Piazza del Campo. The first such races were on buffalo-back and called bufalate; asinate, races on donkey-back, later took their place, while horse racing continued elsewhere. The first modern Palio (called palio alla tonda to distinguish it from the earlier palio alla lunga) took place in 1633.

A second Palio in August
At first, one race was held each year, on 2 July.  A second, on 16 August, was added from 1701, though initially, the August race was run intermittently rather than every year. The August race (il palio dell'Assunta), which coincided with the Feast of the Assumption, was probably introduced "spontaneously" as part of the feasting and celebration associated with this important festival.  The date 16 August was presumably chosen because the other days of the mid-August canonical festival, the 14th and 15th of the month, were already taken up respectively by the Corteo dei Ceri (Procession of the Ceri) and by the census.

The August Palio started out as an extension of the celebrations of the July Palio and was organized and funded by July's winning contrada, though only if the contrada in question could afford it. After 1802, however, organisation and funding the August race became a central responsibility of the city, which removed annual uncertainty over whether or not an August Palio would run. It has been held at least since 15 August 1581 when 15-year-old jockey Virginia Tacci was the first female to ride a steed in the race.

Restriction
In 1729, the city's Munich-born governor, Violante of Bavaria, defined formal boundaries for the contrade, at the same time imposing several mergers so that the number of Sienese contrade was reduced to seventeen.  This was also the year of the decree restricting to ten the number of contrade that could participate in a Palio; the restriction, which remains in force, resulted from the number and extent of accidents experienced in the preceding races.

The seventeen contrade

The seventeen contrade are: 

In each race, only ten of the seventeen contrade participate: the seven which did not participate in the previous year's Palio and three others chosen by drawing lots.

The race today
The first race (Palio di Provenzano) is held on 2 July, which is both the Feast of the Visitation and the date of a local festival in honour of the Madonna of Provenzano (a painting once owned by the Sienese leader Provenzano Salvani, which was supposed to have miraculous curative power). The second race is held on 16 August (Palio dell'Assunta), the day after the Feast of the Assumption, and is likewise dedicated to the Virgin Mary. After exceptional events (e.g., the Apollo 11 moon landing) and on important anniversaries (e.g., the centennial of the Unification of Italy), the Sienese community may decide to hold a third Palio between May and September. The most recent was in 2018 to celebrate the anniversary of the end of WWI.

The field consists of ten horses, so not all seventeen contrade can take part in the Palio on any occasion. The seven contrade that did not take part in that month of the previous year are automatically included; three more are chosen by draw (twice a year, in the last days of May and at the beginning of July). Private owners (among them, some jockeys) offer the pick of their stables, selected during the year after trial races, other Palio races in Italy and veterinary examination, from which main representatives of the participating contrade, the Capitani, choose ten of approximately equal quality, three days before the race. A lottery then determines which horse will run for each contrada. Six trial races are run, the first on the evening of the horse selection and the last on the morning before the Palio. Corruption (bribery) is commonplace, prompting the residents of each contrada, known as contradaioli, to keep a close watch on their stable and their rider. The horses are of mixed breed; no purebred horses are allowed.

The race is preceded by a spectacular pageant to the sound of the March of the Palio, the Corteo Storico, which includes (among many others) Alfieri, flag wavers, in medieval costumes. Just before the pageant, a squad of carabinieri on horseback, wielding swords, demonstrate a mounted charge around the track. They take one lap at a walk, in formation, and a second at a gallop that foreshadows the excitement of the race to come, before exiting down one of the streets that leads out of Piazza del Campo. Spectators arrive early in the morning, eventually filling the centre of the town square, inside the track, to capacity; the local police seal the entrances once the festivities begin in earnest. Seats ranging from simple bleachers to elaborate box seats may be had for a price, but sell out long before the day of the race.
 
At 7:30 p.m. for the July race, and 7 p.m. for the August race, the detonation of an explosive charge echoes across the piazza, signaling to the thousands of onlookers that the race is about to begin. The race itself runs for three laps of the Piazza del Campo, the perimeter of which is covered with several inches of dirt (imported and laid for the occasion at great expense to the city) and the corners of which are protected with padded crash barriers for the occasion. The jockeys ride the horses bareback from the starting line, an area between two ropes. Nine horses, in an order only decided by lot immediately before the race starts, enter the space. The tenth, the rincorsa, waits outside. When the rincorsa finally enters the space between the ropes the starter (mossiere) activates a mechanism that instantly drops the canapo (the front rope). This process (the mossa) can take a very long time, as deals have usually been made between various contrade and jockeys that affect when the rincorsa moves - he may be waiting for a particular other horse to be well- or badly-placed, for example.

On the dangerous, steeply canted track, the riders are allowed to use their whips (in Italian, nerbi, stretched, dried bulls' hide) not only for their own horse, but also for disturbing other horses and riders. The Palio in fact is won by the horse who represents his contrada, and not by the jockeys. The winner is the first horse to cross the finish line—a horse can win without its rider (a condition known as cavallo scosso). A horse can also win without its decorative headgear (spennacchiera), although the opposite belief is widely held even among the Sienese. The loser in the race is considered to be the contrada whose horse came second, not last.

The winner is awarded a banner of painted silk, or palio, which is hand-painted by a different artist for each race. The enthusiasm after the victory, however, is so extreme that the ceremony of attribution of the palio is quite instantaneous, being the first moment of a months-long celebration for the winning ward. There are occasional outbreaks of violence between partisans of rival contrade.

There may be some danger to spectators from the sheer number of people in attendance. There have also been complaints about mistreatment of horses, injuries and even deaths, especially from animal-rights associations and even from some veterinarians. In the Palio held on 16 August 2004, the horse for the contrada of Bruco (the Caterpillar) fell and was badly trampled, as the race was not stopped despite possible additional safety risks for other horses. The horse died of its injuries, raising further complaints from animal-rights organizations.

The Palio differs from "normal" horse races in that part of the game is for the wards to prevent rival contrade from winning. When a contrada fails to win, its historical enemy will celebrate that fact nearly as merrily as a victory of its own, regardless of whether adversarial interference was a deciding factor. Few things are forbidden to the jockeys during the race; for instance, they can pull or shove their fellows, hit the horses and each other, or try to hamper other horses at the start.

The most successful ward is Oca, the Goose, which has won 63 races (at least according to their records, which start from 1644), followed by Chiocciola, the Snail, with 51, and Tartuca, the Tortoise, with 46. Oca is also the contrada with the most wins in recent history (from 1900 to 2010) with 21 victories, followed by Selva, the Forest, with 18, and Drago, the Dragon, with 17.

Among jockeys, the most victorious of all time is Andrea Degortes, nicknamed Aceto ('Vinegar'), with 14 wins (from 1964 to 1996). Angelo Meloni, nicknamed Picino (active from 1897 to 1933) has the second in the number of wins with 13 successes, and Luigi Bruschelli, nicknamed Trecciolino (still active), has the third most of 12 wins (although he claims 13 victories, his horse won without him one year).

The most successful horses were Folco and Panezio with eight wins each, followed by Topolone with seven.

In recent history (from 1900 to the present), only three wards have succeeded in winning both the July and the August races in a single year (the term in Italian is fare cappotto) with the same jockey. Tartuca (the Tortoise) accomplished the feat in 1933 with jockey Fernando Leoni (nicknamed "Ganascia") on Folco.  In 1997, Giraffa (the Giraffe) won both races, with jockey Giuseppe Pes, nicknamed Il Pesse. In 2016, jockey Jonatan Bartoletti, on the mount "Preziosa Penelope", won both the July and August races for Lupa (the She-wolf).

Ritual and rivalry
The Palio di Siena is more than a simple horse race. It is the culmination of ongoing rivalry and competition between the contrade. The lead-up and the day of the race are invested with passion and pride. Formal and informal rituals take place as the day proceeds, with each contrada navigating a strategy of horsemanship, alliances and animosities. There are the final clandestine meetings among the heads of the contrade and then between them and the jockeys. There is the two-hour pageant of the Corteo Storico, and then all this is crowned by the race, which takes only about 75 seconds to complete. Although there is great public spectacle, the passions displayed are still very real.

The contrada that has been the longest without a victory is nicknamed nonna ('grandmother').  Civetta (the Owlet) had the title from 1979 until 2009, when it won 16 August race. Torre (the Tower) had this title for being without victory for 44 years (from 1961 to 2005), and Bruco (the Caterpillar) held the title for not winning over 41 years (from 1955 to 1996). Last nonna was Lupa (the She-Wolf), which has not had a victory since 2 July 1989, a period of  years, until July 2016, when it finally won, leaving now the nonna title to Aquila (the Eagle).

Palio (Drappellone)

The drappellone ("banner"), or palio, known affectionately as cencio ("the rag") in Siena, is the trophy that is to be delivered to the contrada that wins the Palio.

The palio is an elongated rectangular piece of silk, hand-painted by an artist for the occasion. It is held vertically on a black-and-white shaft halberd and topped by a silver plate, with two white and black plumes draped down the sides.

The palio, along with the plumes, remains the property of the contrada. The plate is returned to the city of Siena before the two Palii of the following year, after the date and the name of the victorious contrada are inscribed on its back. There is one silver platter for the Palio in July and another for the August Palio. The plates are replaced approximately every ten years.

The value of the banner is unique, because it represents a particular historical period of the city of Siena. The palii often reflect the symbols of the various governments that have presided at various times, including the crest of the grand duchy of Lorraine, the crest of the Grand Dukes of Tuscany, the crest of the Kingdom of Savoy of Italy, symbols from Fascist Italy, and most recently, imagery of the Republic.

The process that an artist should follow in designing the palio is rigid: it must follow a precise iconography that includes some sacred symbols, as the July Palio is dedicated to the Madonna of Provenzano, and that of August to the Madonna of the Assumption. It must present the insignia of the city, those of the third part of the city, and the symbols or colors of the ten contrade participating in the race. There are, however, no limits regarding the style of the art. The palio is first presented at a press conference in the courtyard of the Podestà of the City Hall about a week before the race.

Preparations throughout the year

Although many activities take place within each contrada, the organization of the Palio is still the largest, since it is not just in two races each year. Each time, the festival itself runs for four days of events, the preparation for which lasts all year.

Beginning in early winter, the contrada leaders talk and develop strategies, making contacts with the jockeys and horse owners. These leaders prepare those who will race in the Piazza del Campo or take part in minor Palios elsewhere in nearby towns (la cosiddetta provincia) and bring them to training courses organized by the city in the spring.

The full activities of the Palio start to grow in momentum towards the end of May, with the drawing of lots of the three remaining contrade that will join the seven that have won the right to race. With districts and teams outlined, contrade begin to talk about "deals" (engagement of jockeys) and "parties" (secret pacts for the win), despite not knowing which horse they will draw in the lot.

About a week before the race, the palio (drappellone) itself is presented to the city, which has commissioned a local artist (in the case of the Palio of July) or internationally recognized artist (in the case of the Palio of August or a special Palio) to create the prize. Also at this time, visits occur to the horses which will be presented for the lottery.

In the first of the four days of the festival, the lottery is held to select which barbero (the term for "racehorse" in the city of Siena and Tuscany) will go to which contrada. The stone race track around the square is covered with a layer of dirt composed of a mixture of tuff, clay and sand. Six trials are run, during which the riders have the opportunity to familiarize themselves with their horse and with the track itself, its sounds and rhythms of the race. The trials, Prova, are held the evening of the horse lottery and twice daily for the next two days. Attended by many tourists and contrada members in square, barriers are mounted on the outside of the track so no people may move in and out during the race. The children of the contrade are assembled in bleachers to sing closest to the city hall during the trials, but adults will sit there on the race day. Children are no longer allowed to stand in the middle of the piazza during the race, and can only view from a bleacher or window.

Among the events that mark the approach of the Palio are the rehearsal dinner, the "mass" of the jockeys and the blessing of the horse and jockey.

Extraordinary Palios 
An extraordinary Palio is a third Palio which may take place during the period between May and September and is associated with events or anniversaries of major importance for the community of Siena. The most recent extraordinary Palio was held in 2018. An extraordinary Palio on 9 September 2000 coincided with the advent of the new millennium and was won by Selva (Forest), by jockey Giuseppe Pes riding on the horse Urban II. Prior to this, the last extraordinary Palio was held on 13 September 1986 to celebrate the centenary of the abolition of the Balia and Biccherna governments.

In earlier times, the third Palio was a way to honor distinguished guests passing through or visiting Siena. Examples are the extraordinary Palio of 7 June 1676, during the visit to Siena of the wife of Prince Don Agostino Chigi, and that of 15 June 1673 (not considered official), honouring the visit to Siena of Cardinal Flavio Chigi. Even the Grand Duke of Tuscany requested another round of Palio, perhaps closer to the ordinary.

From the second half of the 19th century, extraordinary Palios began to be organized for celebration of special events, rather than illustrious visits. This was the case of a meeting of the Society of Sciences or the inauguration of important monuments (such as the inauguration of the monument to the fallen in the Battle of Curtatone and Montanara, on 29 May 1893). In 1896, they even ran four Palios, both ordinary and two extraordinary. The first extraordinary race was on 16 August, which is considered extraordinary because it was requested by the citizens as the original race was moved to 25 August due to transfer from Siena's VIII Corps, and the second was on 23 September for the inauguration of the monument to Giuseppe Garibaldi.

A third Palio, the "Palio of Peace", was held in 1945 by popular acclaim to celebrate the end of World War II and was won by Gioacchino Calabro riding Rubacuori su Folco, for the contrada of Drago (Dragon). An extraordinary Palio was held in 1969 to commemorate the landing on the moon by the Apollo 11 mission.

After 1945 the habit of running extraordinary palios to mark important centenaries emerged.   A palio was held on 28 May 1950 to celebrate the five hundredth anniversary of the canonization of Saint Bernardine of Siena.   On 5 June 1961 an extraordinary palio marked the centenary of unification.   The most recent centenary palio, held on 20 October 2018, commemorated the ending of the First World War in 1918.

Victories per contrada

Controversy and equine security measures
For several years, the Palio has been the focus of numerous protests by animal-rights organizations, including the Anti-Vivisection League. Concerns include primarily race incidents causing falls, which in some cases have led to horses' deaths.

In 2011, these concerns resulted in Italy's tourism minister blocking the Palio from being nominated for listing in the UNESCO Intangible Cultural Heritage Lists.

The results of calculations on the percentage of accidents caused by the Palio vary depending on who makes them. According to the Anti-Vivisection League, a total of 48 horses have died from 1970 to 2007, an average of one dead horse per year. However, the calculations carried out by supporters of the Palio for the same period, which include all the tests held before the real race, give a rate of 2.05% of fatal accidents per ride.

Many rules governing the protection of animals have been developed and implemented only since the 1990s; supporters of the Palio stress that injuries have been drastically reduced since then.

In recent decades, the city of Siena has adopted a series of measures to ensure the protection of horses (and riders) before, during and after the race, but these measures are still judged insufficient by some animal welfare groups, who continue to seek abolition of the race. Among the measures taken include:

 A compulsory health check held by a commission appointed by the City Council and consisting of two surgeons
 Serum chemistry analysis, introduced in May 1999 in order to confirm and verify what has always been required by the Rules, or the prohibition of administration of substances with stimulants and depressants and local anesthetics
 Approval in 1999 the "Protocol for the provision of incentives for the maintenance of the Palio horse" and the establishment of the register of horses trained to run. A register of farmers was introduced in 2004, instead of half blood Arabian horses (deemed physically fit to travel) and a register of barriers
 Building a track in the town of Mociano, identical in shape and slope to the Piazza del Campo. From March to June, in addition to Monticiano and Monteroni d'Arbia, the horses intended for the Palio train here.
 Protections (formerly known as materassoni) present the curve of St. Martin in June 1999 set up a barrier of protection to high absorption in PVC, raising the parapet of the House and the curve of shirts introduction of safety for the emergency personnel of 118,
 Intervention on the composition, method of implementation and monitoring of the layer of tuff
 Care of horses that no longer run the Palio (due to age or injury) at the Equestrian Center of State Forestry, "The Caggio", in the town of Radicondoli.
 Alcohol test for jockeys by order of the Secretary of Health Francesca Martini.

Photo gallery

Feature films

This is the race that is seen in:
 Palio by Alessandro Blasetti (1932)
 La ragazza del Palio by Luigi Zampa (1957)
 Bianco rosso celeste – cronaca dei giorni del Palio di Siena by Luciano Emmer (1963)
 "The Winds Rise", the first episode of the 1983 miniseries The Winds of War, ABC miniseries directed by Dan Curtis
 Il bianco e il nero – Tutti i colori del Palio di Siena by Anton Giulio Onofri (2002)
 The Last Victory by John Appel (2004)
 Visioni di Palio by Anton Giulio Onofri (2004)
 Piazza delle Cinque Lune by Renzo Martinelli (2006)
 Quantum of Solace, the 22nd James Bond movie, directed by Marc Forster (2008)
 Palio by Cosima Spender and John Hunt (2015)

Notes

References 

Brown, Margaret Mcdonough and Titus Buckhardt (1960). Siena, the City of the Virgin. Oxford: Oxford University Press.
Drechsler, Wolfgang (2006). "The Contrade, the Palio and the Ben Comune: Lessons from Siena", Trames 10(2), 99-125.
Dundes, Alan and Alessandro Falassi (2005). La Terra in Piazza. An Interpretation of the Palio of Siena. 2 the new edn. (Orig. 1972). Siena: Nuova Immagine. (Standard work, but meanwhile very controversial because of its Freudian interpretation.)
Falassi, Alessandro (1985). "Palio Pageant: Siena's Everlasting Republic", The Drama Review 29(3), 82-92.
Handelman, Don (1998). Models and Mirrors: Towards an Anthropology of Public Events. Cambridge: Cambridge University Press.
Silverman, Sydel (1979). "On the Use of History in Anthropology: The Palio of Siena", American Ethnologist 6(3), 413-436. (Most important counter-model to Dundes & Falassi.)
Pascal, C. Bennett (1981). "October Horse", Harvard Studies in Classical Philology 85, 261-291.
Spicer, Dorothy Gladys (1958). Festivals of Western Europe. Wilson.

Il Palio di Siena website - English Summary.

See also
Ansano "Ansanello" Giovannelli
List of jockeys of Palio di Siena (with articles on Wikipedia in Italian)
Bravio delle botti of Montepulciano
The Girl who rode the wind by Stacy Gregg (featuring Palio and Palio of Peace also modern racing)

External links

The Palio   The definitive English language site for all Palio Di Siena related information 
Archive of the Palio di Siena I  The Italian archive site includes access to short contemporary films of the Palio for 1930 and most subsequent years.
Archive of the Palio di Siena II 
History of the Race 
www.palio.be 
www.thepalio.eu 
Siena - Map It Out!   How to Survive a Day at the Palio
How to be more than a spectator 

Siena
Culture of Tuscany
Italian traditions
Festivals in Italy
Horse races in Italy
Tourist attractions in Tuscany
Sport in Tuscany
1656 establishments in the Grandy Duchy of Tuscany
August events
Historical competitions of Italy